Zawadzkiego-Klonowica is a municipal neighbourhood of the city of Szczecin, Poland,  situated on the left bank of Oder river, in Zachód (West) District. It borders Krzekowo-Bezrzecze to the west, Głębokie-Pilchowo and Osów to the north, Arkońskie-Niemierzyn to the east, and Pogodno to the south. As of January 2011 it had a population of 12,983.

References

Zawadzkiego-Klonowica